Kabilas may refer to:

Kabilas, Gandaki, Nepal
Kabilas, Narayani, Nepal